Michele McLaughlin (born 1974) is an American New-age music Billboard charts pianist and composer.
She has released twenty-one albums and a single, many of which have received awards, nominations and favorable reviews.

A self-taught pianist and composer, McLaughlin played the instrument as a kindergartner. Inspired by a performance of George Winston's she saw at just eight years old, she applied herself to learn his tunes by ear and eventually began writing her own pieces. She released her first album Beginnings in 2000.

McLaughlin tours throughout the USA  and performs regularly in her home town area of Salt Lake City, Utah

Pianists she has performed with include Jennifer Thomas, Tim Neumark  and Scott D. Davis.

Selected awards and nominations
 2017 Winner -  Utah Music Awards - Life 
 2017 Nominees and Finalists - American Songwriting Awards - Life 
 2017 Nominated - Just Plain Folks Music Awards - Breathing in the Moment 
 2015 Nominated - The Indie Music Channel (IMC) Best Album Award  - Undercurrent 
 2015 Nominated - The Hollywood Music in Media Awards™ (HMMA) - Undercurent 
 2015 Nominated - One World Music Radio Awards - Undercurrent '
 2015 Nominated - The 15th Independent Music Award - The Space Between
 2015 Finalist - The John Lennon Songwriting Contest - 11,000 Miles 
 2013 Winner - Whisperings Solo Piano Radio (founder David Nevue) album of the year - Waking the Muse 
 2012 Nominated - Independent Music Awards - Melancholy Snowfall

Albums
 2017	Life (reached number 7 New Age Albums Billboard charts March 4, 2017)
 2015	Undercurrent (reached number 5 New Age Albums Billboard charts March 14, 2015) 
 2015  Top 20 Solo Piano
 2013	Waking the Muse
 2012	Breathing In the Moment
 2010  Christmas Plain & Simple II	
 2010	Out of the Darkness
 2008	A Celtic Dream
 2007	Dedication
 2006	Christmas Plain & Simple
 2006	Reflections 2000-2005: The Best of Michele McLaughlin
 2005	After the Storm
 2004	The Beginning of Forever
 2003	A Change of Color
 2002	The Journey
 2001	Elysium
 2000	Beginnings

Singles
 2017 Dismissed.

Reviews
 Album Review  - Life 
 Album Review  - Top 20 
 Album Review -  Undercurrent 
 Album Review - Breathing in the Moment 
 Album Review - Waking the Muse 
 Song Review -  Joffrey Ballet - Contemporary Choreographers - Crossing Ashland - Perseverance

References

Musicians from Salt Lake City
Living people
21st-century American composers
1974 births
21st-century American women pianists
21st-century American pianists
Composers for piano
New-age pianists
21st-century women composers